The Chicago Linguistic Society (or CLS) is one of the oldest student-run organizations in the United States, based at the University of Chicago.  Although its exact foundation date is obscure, according to Eric Hamp it is generally believed to antedate the Second World War, and possibly extends back to Bloomfield's and Sapir's tenure at the University in the 1920s and 1930s.

Since 1965, CLS has run an annual conference that has received an international status in linguistics comparable to BLS, the LSA, WCCFL and NELS. Focus on syntax, morphology, semantics, pragmatics, sociolinguistics, phonology, phonetics, and allied fields of cognitive and social sciences are presented at this conference. Special topics include Heritage Languages, 
Speech Acts, and Resumptivity.

External links 
The University of Chicago website
The Chicago Linguistic Society website

Linguistic societies
University of Chicago
Organizations based in Chicago